Bei-Tuo (北拖, meaning North Tug) 739-class tug is a class of little known sea-going rescue tug (ATR) built in the People’s Republic of China (PRC) for the People's Liberation Army Navy (PLAN).

Built by Huangpu Shipyard, Bei-Tuo 739-class tug is developed from three 14,000 kW civilian sea-going rescue tug built earlier by the same shipyard. Dispalced at more than six thousand tons, the tug is more than a hundred-ten meters long with sixteen meter beam. Rescue and towing equipment are located on afterdeck, and helipad is located on foredeck in front of the superstructure. Powered by a pair of 7200 kW engine with total output of 14400 kW total, Bei-Tuo 739 class tug is the fastest, largest and most powerful tug currently in service with PLAN (as of 2022).

References

Auxiliary ships of the People's Liberation Army Navy